Boyd Rouse (born 27 October 1993) is a Zimbabwe rugby union player, currently playing for the  in the 2022 Currie Cup First Division. His preferred position is fly-half or centre.

Professional career
Rouse was named in the  squad for the 2022 Currie Cup First Division. He has also represented Zimbabwe in rugby sevens.

References

External links
itsrugby.co.uk Profile

1993 births
Living people
Rugby union fly-halves
Rugby union centres
Zimbabwean rugby union players
Zimbabwe Goshawks players